Iezer may refer to several places in Romania:

 Iezer, a village in Hilișeu-Horia Commune, Botoșani County
 Iezer, a village in Puiești Commune, Vaslui County
 Iezer Mountains in Argeș County
 Iezer, a tributary of the Ighiu in Alba County
 Iezer (Tutova), tributary of the Tutova in Vaslui County
 Iezer, a tributary of the Mălaia in Vâlcea County
 Iezerul Mare, a tributary of the Bătrâna in Argeș County